The Honolulu Military Academy was founded by its president, Col. L. G. Blackman, in 1911. It was controlled by a board of 10 trustees of which the president was a member and presiding officer ex officio. It was located at Kaimuki near Wai'alae Bay, a mile from the end of the Waialae street-car line. The buildings stood on high ground overlooking the ocean.

The school drew its cadets from all points in the islands. The 1918-19 roster showed 64 from Honolulu, 10 from Oahu outside of Honolulu, 16 from Hawaii, 11 from Maui, 10 from Kauai, 1 from Molokai, 2 from California, and 1 each from New York State, Minnesota, and Japan. The military regime was a dominant feature of the school's organization, as the name of the Academy indicates. It began by providing only elementary grade instruction, and later grew to offer a 12-grade program of studies. The school was split into three divisions: an elementary school, grades 1–6; a junior academy, grades 7, 8, 9; and a senior academy, grades 10, 11, 12.

References 

U.S. Department of the Interior, U.S. Bureau of Education, Bulletin 1920, No.13, Educational Work of the Commercial Museum of Philadelphia by Charles R. Toothacker (Curator), Washington Gov. Printing Office 1921

Educational institutions established in 1911
Military high schools in the United States
Private K-12 schools in Honolulu
1911 establishments in Hawaii
Defunct schools in Hawaii